Ectropina ligata is a moth of the family Gracillariidae. It is known from South Africa and Namibia.

References

Gracillariinae
Moths of Africa
Insects of Namibia
Moths described in 1912